CTNS may refer to:
 Center for Theology and the Natural Sciences, a research center of the Graduate Theological Union
 CTNS (gene)